Tamahime (珠姫) or Tama (1599-1622) was a Japanese noble lady, member of the aristocrat Tokugawa family during the Edo period. She was the second daughter of the shogun Tokugawa Hidetada, and her mother was Oeyo, both important figures who stabilized and ruled the Tokugawa shogunate. She was also the wife of  Maeda Toshitsune, the 2nd daimyō of Kaga Domain.

Genealogy 

Tamahime was the daughter of Hidetada, the second shogun of the Edo era, son of Tokugawa Ieyasu. Her mother was Oeyo, third daughter of Azai Nagamasa with Oichi and niece of Oda Nobunaga. She was the sister of Senhime (wife of Toyotomi Hideyori), Katsuhime (1601-1672), Hatsuhime (1602-1630), Tokugawa Iemitsu (1604-1651), Tokugawa Tadanaga (1606-1633) and Empress Masako (1607 -1678).

Family 
At the age of 3, she entered a political marriage with Maeda Toshitsune (1594-1658), son of Maeda Toshiie, to strengthen the alliance between the Tokugawa and the Maeda. During the marriage they had many children

 Kikakuhime (1613-1630), adopted by Iemitsu and married to Mori Tadahiro, son of Mori Tadamasa.
 Maeda Mitsutaka (1616-1645)
 Maeda Toshitsugu (1617-1674)
 Maeda Toshiharu (1618-1660)
 Manhime (1620-1700) adopted by Iemitsu, married toAsano Mitsuakira
 Tomihime (1621-1662)

She lived little as a princess member of the Shogunate, dying in 1622 at the age of 22.

References 

1622 deaths
1599 births
16th-century Japanese people
Edo period
People of Edo-period Japan
Tokugawa clan
Maeda clan
Deaths in childbirth